The United Kingdom's Pilotage Act 1987 is an Act of Parliament that governs the operation of maritime pilotage. The Act repealed the previous pilotage legislation in its entirety, the Pilotage Act 1983, which itself had repealed the Pilotage Act 1913.

Content of the act
The act requires competent harbour authorities (CHA) to keep under consideration what pilotage services are needed to secure the safety of ships and gives them powers to:
 make pilotage compulsory within their pilotage district and levy charges for the use of a pilot;
 grant pilotage exemption certificates (PEC) to any bona fide master or first mate who has the skill, experience or local knowledge to pilot their own ship in a compulsory pilotage area; and,
 authorise pilots within their district.

The act requires the Secretary of State to maintain a list of CHAs, and also allows the Secretary of State to authorise other bodies to grant deep sea pilotage certificates in respect of such part of the sea falling outside the harbour of any CHA.

Competent harbour authority

The act established the definition of a CHA as any harbour authority that has statutory powers relating to the regulation of shipping movements and the safety of navigation. Initially, a CHA also had to be one whose harbour was wholly or partly within a pilotage district where at least one act of pilotage had been performed, or where a PEC had been in force, between 1984 and 1987. However, the act provided a procedure by which other harbour authorities could be assigned CHA status.

Impact of the act
Prior to this act, Trinity House was responsible for the provision of local pilots for entering ports. Today, the Corporation of Trinity House is one three authorised bodies responsible for deep sea pilotage, working closely with Trinity House Newcastle upon Tyne and Trinity House Hull to examine and license deep sea pilots.

Following the Sea Empress disaster in 1996, the Department for Environment, Transport and the Regions undertook a review of the Act which concluded that "Pilotage should rightly remain the responsibility of the CHAs and become integrated with other port marine activity under the management and responsibility of one Statutory Authority". The principal recommendation of the Review was for the establishment of the Port Marine Safety Code, which was first published in 2000. 

The act has been amended by the Marine Navigation Act 2013 to:
 provide a mechanism for a CHA to relinquish its duties and powers in respect of pilotage;
 permit pilotage exemption certificates to be awarded to a bona fide deck officer (qualified as before by reference to skill, experience and local knowledge); and,
 tighten powers on the use, suspension and revocation of pilotage exemption certificates.

References

United Kingdom Acts of Parliament 1987
Ports and harbours of the United Kingdom
Competent harbour authorities